Hebrew is a Unicode block containing characters for writing the Hebrew, Yiddish, Ladino, and other Jewish diaspora languages.

Block

History
The following Unicode-related documents record the purpose and process of defining specific characters in the Hebrew block:

See also 
 Hebrew alphabet in Unicode
 Alphabetic Presentation Forms (Unicode block)

References 

Unicode blocks